Ángel Urrutia (born 9 January 1945) is a Spanish rower. He competed in the men's coxed pair event at the 1968 Summer Olympics.

References

External links
 
 

1945 births
Living people
Spanish male rowers
Olympic rowers of Spain
Rowers at the 1968 Summer Olympics
Place of birth missing (living people)